Viktor Manakov may refer to:

 Viktor Manakov (cyclist, born 1960), Soviet cyclist
 Viktor Manakov (cyclist, born 1992), Russian cyclist